The public holidays in Serbia are defined by the Law of national and other holidays in the Republic of Serbia.

Public holidays 

1 If one of the non-religious holidays falls on a Sunday, then the next working day is a non-working day.

Religious holidays 
Additionally, the employees of Christian, Muslim and Jewish religion are allowed not to work on some of their religious holidays.

Working holidays 

Some holidays are defined by the Law as working holidays, hence they are not bank holidays, but they are observed by the state and people.

See also
 Public holidays in Yugoslavia

References
 

 
Serbia
Holidays